Çekmeköy is an underground station on the M5 line of the Istanbul Metro in Çekmeköy. The station is located on Şile Highway  in the Mehmet Akif neighborhood of Çekmeköy. Connection to IETT city buses is available from at street level.

The M5 line operates as fully automatic unattended train operation (UTO). The station consists of an island platform with two tracks. Since the M5 is an ATO line, protective gates on each side of the platform open only when a train is in the station.

Çekmeköy station was opened on 21 October 2018.

The station has 2 exits. There are 6 elevators and 12 escalators.

Station layout

Connections 
Connection to IETT city buses is available from at street level.

City buses; 9ÇN, 122D, 122H, 131K, 132ÇK, 522, 522B,  ÇM44, UM40, UM60, UM61, UM62, UM73

Ongoing M5 line construction (future service) 
As of 2021, the last station of the east side of the 20-kilometer M5 metro line is Çekmeköy station. M5 Çekmeköy- Sancaktepe - Sultanbeyli metro, which is under construction, will have a total length of 30.9 kilometres in case the third stage is completed.

References

External links 

 Official Website of Istanbul Metro (in English)

Railway stations opened in 2018
Istanbul metro stations
Ümraniye
2018 establishments in Turkey